The Soling World Championship is an International sailing regatta in the Soling organized by the International Soling Association under auspiciën of World Sailing.

Most titles has Norwegian sailor Paul Davis won, with four titles between 2002 and 2012 and another one podiums. Second most titles has Brazilian Vicente Brun, with three.

The most championships has been won by American sailors, nine editions, followed by Canadian sailor, seven titles, and sailors of Denmark (5).

The Soling was an Olympic class from 1972 to 2000.

History
The first Soling World Championships were held in Copenhagen in 1969, the year after the selection as Olympic Three-Men Keelboat for the 1972 Summer Olympics.

Editions

Medalists

Multiple World Champions Ranking

See also
 Soling World Championship results (1969–1979)
 Soling World Championship results (1980–1984)
 Soling World Championship results (1985–1989)
 Soling World Championship results (1990–1994)

References

Soling World Championships
Recurring sporting events established in 1969